Rząśnia  is a village in Pajęczno County, Łódź Voivodeship, in central Poland. It is the seat of the gmina (administrative district) called Gmina Rząśnia.

References

Villages in Pajęczno County
Piotrków Governorate